Corcoran is a city in Kings County, California. It is part of the Hanford–Corcoran Metropolitan Statistical Area. The population was 24,813 (2010 census), up from 14,458 (2000 census). The California Department of Finance estimated that Corcoran's population was 21,960 in 2019.

Corcoran is most notable as the site of the California State Prison, Corcoran. It was home to notable inmates Rodney Alcala, Charles Manson and Juan Corona. The California Substance Abuse Treatment Facility and State Prison, Corcoran is a separate facility that is also located in the city. As of January 1, 2015, the two prisons held a combined total of 9,592 inmates.  Inmates are counted as city residents by both the United States Census and the California Department of Finance. Thus, the incarcerated people in the two prisons comprise just over 43% of the total population of Corcoran.

Geography

The ground under Corcoran is subsiding due to withdrawal of groundwater by agricultural interests.

Soils around Corcoran are somewhat poorly drained to poorly drained loam or fine sandy loam which is often saline as in the widespread Lakeside series. Other important soil series include the Armona, Gambogy, Grangeville, Kimberlina, and Lemoore.

Climate

Demographics

2010
The 2010 United States Census reported that Corcoran had a population of 24,813. The racial makeup of Corcoran was 8,940 (36.0%) White, 3,725 (15.0%) African American, 349 (1.4%) Native American, 193 (0.8%) Asian, 17 (0.1%) Pacific Islander, 10,979 (44.2%) from other races, and 610 (2.5%) from two or more races. Hispanic or Latino of any race were 15,545 people (62.6%).

The Census reported that 12,573 people (50.7% of the population) lived in households, 116 (0.5%) lived in non-institutionalized group quarters, and 12,124 (48.9%) were institutionalized.

There were 3,594 households, out of which 1,981 (55.1%) had children under the age of 18 living in them, 1,737 (48.3%) were opposite-sex married couples living together, 781 (21.7%) had a female householder with no husband present, 376 (10.5%) had a male householder with no wife present. There were 384 (10.7%) unmarried opposite-sex partnerships, and 19 (0.5%) same-sex married couples or partnerships. 556 households (15.5%) were made up of individuals, and 214 (6.0%) had someone living alone who was 65 years of age or older. The average household size was 3.50. There were 2,894 families (80.5% of all households); the average family size was 3.84.

The population was spread out, with 4,434 people (17.9%) under the age of 18, 2,695 people (10.9%) aged 18 to 24, 10,203 people (41.1%) aged 25 to 44, 6,163 people (24.8%) aged 45 to 64, and 1,318 people (5.3%) who were 65 years of age or older. The median age was 35.0 years. For every 100 females, there were 294.8 males. For every 100 females age 18 and over, there were 398.0 males.

The homeowner vacancy rate was 1.7%; the rental vacancy rate was 11.8%. 6,607 people (26.6% of the population) lived in owner-occupied housing units and 5,966 people (24.0%) lived in rental housing units.

2000
As of the census of 2000, there were 14,458 people, 2,769 households, and 2,229 families residing in the city. The racial makeup of the city was 34.1% White, 14.2% Black or African American, 1.4% Native American, 0.7% Asian, 0.1% Pacific Islander, 46.4% from other races, and 3.1% from two or more races. 59.6% of the population were Hispanic or Latino of any race.

There were 2,769 households, out of which 49.7% had children under the age of 18 living with them, 54.5% were married couples living together, 17.9% had a female householder with no husband present, and 19.5% were non-families. 16.0% of all households were made up of individuals, and 6.3% had someone living alone who was 65 years of age or older. The average household size was 3.44 and the average family size was 3.83.

In the city, the population was spread out, with 24.4% under the age of 18, 13.0% from 18 to 24, 42.0% from 25 to 44, 15.3% from 45 to 64, and 5.4% who were 65 years of age or older. The median age was 31 years. For every 100 females, there were 207.8 males. For every 100 females age 18 and over, there were 264.9 males. However, the statistics relating to the disparity between the male and female population in Corcoran is due to the prison's male only population.

Economy
At the time of the 2000 census, the median income for a household in the city was $30,783, and the median income for a family was $32,852. Males had a median income of $30,787 versus $21,792 for females. The per capita income for the city was only $13,458. It is noteworthy that about 23.4% of families and 26.9% of the population were below the poverty line, including 36.4% of those under age 18 and 10.6% of those age 65 or over.

Many local residents are employed in agriculture. However, the community has been affected by the Great Recession as well as the decline of the cotton industry, the California drought and restrictions on pumping from the Sacramento River delta to protect endangered species. In November 2016, the unemployment rate was 11.1%.

The largest employers in Corcoran include the California State Prison, Corcoran, the California Substance Abuse Treatment Facility and State Prison, Corcoran, the Corcoran Unified School District, and the J. G. Boswell Company.

Politics
Corcoran is located within California's 21st congressional district, and is represented by Republican David G. Valadao.

In the California State Legislature, Corcoran is located within:
 14th California State Senate District, which is represented by Democrat Melissa Hurtado
 32nd California State Assembly District, represented by Democrat Rudy Salas.

Corcoran is represented on the Kings County Board of Supervisors by Richard Valle of Corcoran.

Civic services
Corcoran employs twenty-one full time personnel including 15 uniformed officers, five clerk-dispatchers, two reserve officers, and Animal Control Services. Kings County Fire Department provides firemen who provide services with the assistance of volunteers. Industrial sites—There are approximately 320 acres in the city limits zones for light and heavy industry with two industrial parks included in this total.

History
Corcoran was founded by Hobart Johnstone Whitley, a prominent land developer from southern California, who took the lead in building Corcoran (the main street of the community is named in his honor). Liking what he saw during a visit to the area in 1905 (a blacksmith shop, small store, scattered homes and a lush, untapped vista with herds of grazing wild hogs, horses and steers) Whitley purchased  to start development. Much like in the San Fernando Valley (Van Nuys and Canoga Park his "creations"), Whitley "leveraged" his holdings with the support of important Los Angeles businessmen. Whitley first intended the town be named "Otis", after Harrison Gray Otis of the Los Angeles Times, and streets as Otis, Sherman, Letts (the Broadway store) and Ross (after his son, Ross Whitley) show the connections. Whitley, it is claimed, purchased and platted some 150 towns over the American West—and Corcoran is one of his last.

Whitley moved a member of his real estate firm, J. W. Guiberson, to the area. Guiberson became one of the many pioneers of the community, building the first home and business structure in Corcoran. His family also helped establish the first church in the community, an event which helped lead to the town's incorporation on August 14, 1914.

The basis of Corcoran's economy then and now is agriculture. Initially, the most successful crops were grains, alfalfa and sugar beets.

In 1933, more than 12,000 workers went on strike against cotton farmers, one of the largest California agricultural strikes of 1933. Strikers in Corcoran created a tent city that eventually held more than 3,000 people, more than double the town's population. Its lack of water or sewage systems created waves of illness. Streets were staked out in the tent city, and committees of workers governed the camp.

The J. G. Boswell Company was established in Corcoran in 1921 and remains a major employer in the city.

The first post office opened in 1901.

Education
Corcoran Unified School District is the public organization responsible for education in the town of Corcoran. The school district has seven schools.
 Bret Harte
 John C. Fremont
 Mark Twain
 John Muir Middle School
 Corcoran High School
 Corcoran Academy
 Kings Lake Educational Center

Railroads
Corcoran is served by the BNSF Railway, which is the successor to the Santa Fe Railway. The mainline track through Corcoran was part of a route connecting the San Francisco Bay Area to Bakersfield, California. The track was constructed by the San Francisco and San Joaquin Valley Railway about 1898.

Today, Amtrak California's San Joaquin stops at Corcoran station.

From 1910 to 1934, the Kings Lake Shore Railroad operated a line that ran southwest from Corcoran to what is the now-extinct Tulare Lake.

On December 2, 2010, the California High-Speed Rail Authority Board voted to start construction of the first part of the California High-Speed Rail line at Borden near Madera and continue it to Corcoran. Construction began in 2012.

See also

Corcoran Prisoner of War Branch Camp

References

Further reading

External links
City of Corcoran
Corcoran Health Center
Corcoran Unified School District

 
Cities in Kings County, California
San Joaquin Valley
1914 establishments in California
Populated places established in 1914
Incorporated cities and towns in California